State Route 399 (SR 399) is  east–west state highway in the Cumberland Plateau region of Tennessee. It serves to connect the towns of Gruetli-Laager and Palmer to Cagle and the Savage Gulf State Natural Area portion of South Cumberland State Park.

SR 399 is known as Barkertown Road in Grundy County and Rifle Range Road in Sequatchie County.

Route description

SR 399 begins in Grundy County on the Gruetli-Laager–Palmer city line at an intersection with SR 108. It heads northeasterly through farmland and rural areas to cross a bridge over the Collins River before passing by the Savage Gulf State Natural Area portion of South Cumberland State Park. The highway then curves to the east and crosses into Sequatchie County. SR 399 then goes through remote wooded areas for the next several miles before entering farmland and the community of Cagle to come to an end at an intersection with SR 8/SR 111. The entire route of SR 399 is a two-lane rural highway and lies entirely atop the Cumberland Plateau.

Major intersections

References

399
Transportation in Grundy County, Tennessee
Transportation in Sequatchie County, Tennessee